Hylemya variata is a species of fly in the family Anthomyiidae. It is found in the  Palearctic . For identification see:

References

External links
Images representing Hylemya variata at BOLD

Anthomyiidae
Insects described in 1823
Muscomorph flies of Europe